bazene (also Romanized as bazene, bazene is a city and capital of Qarah Kahriz District, in Shazand County, Markazi Province, Iran.  At the 2006 census, its population was 3,900, in 988 families.

References

Populated places in Shazand County

Cities in Markazi Province